The St. Bernard Church is a religious building belonging to the Catholic Church and is located in the city of Kralendijk the capital of the Caribbean island of Bonaire, a territory in the Caribbean Dutch organized as a special municipality of the Kingdom of the Netherlands in the Antilles.

The temple follows the Roman or Latin rite and depends on the Catholic Diocese of Willemstad on the neighboring island of Curacao. The yellow and white color scheme and its triangular main part stands out, and is topped by a cross. It is adjacent next to the bell tower. It offers mass in the local language Papiamento.

Two previous churches in honor of St. Bernard were built on this site: one in the eighteenth century and the other in 1829. The current church was built in 1948.

See also
Roman Catholicism in the Caribbean part of the Kingdom of the Netherlands
Roman Catholic Diocese of Willemstad

References

Roman Catholic churches in Bonaire
Buildings and structures in Kralendijk
Roman Catholic churches completed in 1948
20th-century Roman Catholic church buildings in the Netherlands